Aylesbury is the county town of Buckinghamshire, England. 

Aylesbury may also refer to:

People 
 Aylesbury Baronets
 Sir Thomas Aylesbury, 1st Baronet (1576–1657), English civil servant
 Thomas Aylesbury (theologian) (fl. 1622–1659), theologian
 William Aylesbury (1612–1656), English translator
 Eadgyth of Aylesbury (7th century), Catholic saint from Anglo-Saxon England

Aylesbury, Buckinghamshire 
 Aylesbury (HM Prison)
 Aylesbury (UK Parliament constituency)
 Aylesbury and Buckingham Railway
 Aylesbury College
 Aylesbury F.C.
 Aylesbury High Street railway station
 Aylesbury Hundred
 Aylesbury railway station
 Aylesbury Rural District
 Aylesbury United F.C.
 Aylesbury Urban Area
 Aylesbury Vale
 Aylesbury Vale Parkway railway station
 Battle of Aylesbury
 Municipal Borough of Aylesbury

Other uses 
 Aylesbury, Saskatchewan, Canada
 Aylesbury, Tallaght, Ireland
 Aylesbury, New Zealand
 Aylesbury Estate, Walworth, South London, England
 Aylesbury duck, a breed of domesticated duck bred in Aylesbury
 Aylesbury, Massachusetts, a fictional town created by H. P. Lovecraft

See also 
 
 Aylesby, England